The Boris & Nicole Show is an American syndicated entertainment talk show created and hosted by Boris Kodjoe and Nicole Ari Parker. The series premiered on July 6, 2015, and received a four-week test run.

References

External links 
 
 

2010s American television talk shows
2015 American television series debuts
2015 American television series endings
First-run syndicated television programs in the United States
Television series by 20th Century Fox Television
English-language television shows
Television shows set in New York City